Terrified is the seventh album by American heavy metal band Quiet Riot. It is the band's first album in five years, and marks the return of singer Kevin DuBrow after his firing in 1987. It is bassist Kenny Hillery's only studio album with the band, and drummer Bobby Rondinelli plays on several songs. Many of the album's songs were featured in Charles Band's movie Dollman vs. Demonic Toys, with the album itself being released on Moonstone Records, the soundtrack offshoot of Band's film company Full Moon Entertainment.
 
The song "Itchycoo Park" is a cover of the Small Faces' single from 1967. This was not the first time the band had covered a Small Faces song, they had also done covers of their music on their first two albums, which featured Randy Rhoads.

This is the first Quiet Riot album released internationally not to feature the production work of Spencer Proffer.

In 1994, the album won the American Indie Music Award for the Heavy Metal category.

Although the band have recorded another six studio albums following Terrified, the band's last non-promotional single was issued from this album. In Germany, the band's cover of the "Itchycoo Park" was issued as a CD single via Concrete, with distribution by Edel. Concrete was a project of Edel which specialized in rock releases. The single, which featured the album track "Rude Boy" as the b-side, was not a commercial success. Additionally, in February 1993, the band issued the one-track promotional single "Little Angel" in America, which was released by Moonstone Records. The single featured a picture CD of an almost topless woman, and a custom printed back insert.

Release
The album was released by Moonstone Records on CD and cassette in America only. In Scandinavia it was issued on CD via Mega Records. In Japan the album was issued via Alfa Records, Inc as a CD, which was the only version of the album to feature the exclusive bonus track "Wishing Well" - a cover of the song originally performed by English rock group Free, taken from their 1972 album Heartbreaker. In 1994, Fonomusic would issue Terrified on CD in Spain.

In 2002, Arena Records re-issued the album in Germany under the opening track title "Cold Day in Hell". The CD release featured new artwork of the line-up of the time, including bassist Rudy Sarzo, although he was not a member of the band when Terrified was recorded. The album saw a vinyl reissue in 2017 via Night of the Vinyl Dead, limited to 350 hand numbered copies.

Track listing

Personnel

Quiet Riot
Kevin DuBrow - lead vocals
Carlos Cavazo - guitars
Kenny Hillery - bass
Frankie Banali - drums

Additional musicians
Bobby Rondinelli - drums
Chuck Wright - backing vocals on "Loaded Gun"
Sean Manning - backing vocals on "Cold Day in Hell & Rude Boy"

Production
Kevin DuBrow - producer
Ricky DeLena - producer

References

Quiet Riot albums
1993 albums